Hyalmar Blixen Lerena (3 October 1916 – 17 February 2007) was a Uruguayan poet, novelist and essayist.

He was born in Montevideo in 1917 into a cultured family, the eldest of four children. His father, Mario Blixen Claret (1883–1939), was the Minister of Finance, and his mother  (1889–1967) was a writer and poet. Her great-grandfather was 
Eduardo Acevedo Maturana and her uncle was Eduardo Acevedo Díaz. His siblings were Julio (1918–1994), Olaf Blixen (born 1922), a noted anthropologist, and Sonia (born 1926).

He taught for many years at the Instituto de Estudios Superiores (Institute of Higher Studies) in Montevideo. Alongside his novels and poems, he also published numerous essays in the journals El Dia and Lea. He received several prizes during his lifetime. He died in 2007.

Novels
 Los Iporá (1939)
 Bajo los 13 cielos (1972)
 Aquel año 3, Tochtli (1974)
 Antes del amanecer (1984)

Poetry
 Instantes del viento (1965)
 La rosa de cien colores (1977)

References

2007 deaths
Uruguayan novelists
Male novelists
20th-century Uruguayan poets
Uruguayan male poets
Uruguayan people of Swedish descent
Writers from Montevideo
Year of birth uncertain
20th-century male writers
1910s births